Thioanisole is an organic compound with the formula CH3SC6H5. It is a colorless liquid that is soluble in organic solvents. It is the simplest alkyl–aryl thioether. The name indicates that this compound is the sulfur analogue—the thioether rather than the oxygen-centered ether—of anisole.  

It can be prepared by methylation of thiophenol.

Reactions
Alkyllithium reagents deprotonate thioanisole at the methyl group to afford C6H5SCH2Li, a strong nucleophile that can be alkylated to form more complex chains and structures. The resulting homologated thioether can be manipulated in a variety of ways.  

Oxidation of sulfur via addition of a single oxygen atom gives methyl phenyl sulfoxide, a reaction useful for titration of oxidants such as dimethyldioxirane. Successive oxidation then leads to the sulfone.

References

Thioethers
Phenyl compounds
Foul-smelling chemicals